Józef Zachariasz Bem (March 14, 1794 – December 10, 1850) was a Polish engineer and general, an Ottoman pasha and a national hero of Poland and Hungary, and a figure intertwined with other European patriotic movements. Like Tadeusz Kościuszko (who fought in the American War of Independence) and Jan Henryk Dąbrowski (who fought alongside Napoleon Bonaparte in Italy and in the French Invasion of Russia), Bem fought outside Poland's borders anywhere his leadership and military skills were needed.

Early life

He was born on 14 March 1794 in Tarnów in Galicia, the area of Poland that had become part of the Habsburg monarchy through the First Partition in 1772. After the creation of the Duchy of Warsaw from the territories captured by Napoleon, he moved with his parents to Kraków, where after finishing military school (where he distinguished himself in mathematics) and joined the ducal forces as a fifteen-year-old cadet. He joined a Polish artillery regiment as a sub-lieutenant and then lieutenant in the French service, took part in the French invasion of Russia (1812), and subsequently distinguished himself in the defence of Danzig (JanuaryNovember 1813), winning the Knight's Cross of the Legion d'honneur.

After the Congress of Vienna in 1815, the Duchy of Warsaw was transformed into the constitutional Kingdom of Poland, a dependent territory of the Russian Empire, and Bem became a teacher at a military college. There he carried out research on a newly designed rocket-like missile, publishing his research with extensive illustrations.

Bem became involved in a political conspiracy to restore Poland to full independence, but, when his membership in a secret patriotic organisation was discovered, he was demoted and sentenced (in 1822) to one year in prison. Although the sentence was suspended, Bem resigned his commission and moved to Galicia. In Galicia he researched steam engines and their application, and again published his results. Bem lived in Lwów (now Lviv) and Brody until 1830, where he planned to write a treatise on the steam engine.

November Uprising

When the November Uprising, a struggle for Polish independence, broke out on November 29, 1830, against the Russian Empire, Bem immediately joined the Polish insurgents. He arrived in Warsaw, was given a major's commission and the command of the 4th Light Cavalry Battalion, which he led during the Battles of Iganie and Ostrołęka. During the Battle of Ostrołęka, Bem's forces bravely charged the Russian opponents. Although the Polish army suffered a serious defeat with a loss of 6,000 men, Bem's actions prevented the destruction of the entire army. For his valour on the battlefield, Bem was awarded the Virtuti Militari Golden Cross and promoted to the rank of Brigadier General. He was steadfastly against capitulation until the very end of the Uprising, during the desperate defence of Warsaw against Prince Paskievich (September 27, 1831). Nonetheless, the Polish army was eventually compelled to lay down arms on October 5, 1831, and crossed the Russian–Prussian partitional border under the command of General Maciej Rybiński in the Great Emigration.

First exile
Bem then escaped to Paris, where he supported himself by teaching mathematics. In France, he published his next work, on the National Uprising in Poland, in which he not only gave an appraisal of the 1831 insurrection, but also tried to present a programme for the continuation of the struggle for the country's freedom. During his stay in France, he collaborated with the Hôtel Lambert organization and was a member of the Historical and Literary Society.

In 1833 he went to Portugal to assist the liberal Dom Pedro against the reactionary Dom Miguel, but abandoned the idea when it was found that a Polish legion could not be formed there. When in Portugal, he was the target of an assassination attempt, carried out by Russian agents.

1848 hero

A wider field for his activity presented itself in 1848 (along with the Austrian Revolution). First he attempted to hold Vienna against the imperial troops of Alfred I, Prince of Windisch-Grätz, and, after the capitulation, hastened to Pressburg (today Bratislava, Slovakia) to offer his services to Lajos Kossuth, first defending himself, in a long speech, from the accusations of "treachery to the Polish cause" and "aristocratic tendencies" — which the more fanatical section of the Polish émigré Radicals repeatedly brought against him. He was entrusted with the defence of Transylvania at the end of 1848, and in 1849, as General of the Székely troops, he performed miracles with his little army, notably at the bridge of Piski (now Simeria, Romania) on February 9, where, after fighting all day, he drove back an immense force of pursuers.

After relieving Transylvania he was sent to drive the Austrian General Anton Freiherr von Puchner out of the Banat region. Bem defeated von Puchner at Orsova (now Orșova) on May 16, but the Russian invasion forced Bem to retreat to Transylvania. From July 12 to 22 Bem was fighting continually, but finally, on 31 July 1849, his army was annihilated by overwhelming numbers in the Battle of Segesvár (now Sighişoara); Bem escaped after feigning death. He fought a fresh action at Nagycsür (now Șura Mare) on August 6, and contrived to bring his fragmented army to the Battle of Temesvár (now Timișoara), to aid the hard-pressed General Henryk Dembiński. Bem was in command and was seriously wounded in the last pitched battle of the war, fought there on August 9.

Second exile and death
On the collapse of the rebellion he fled to the Ottoman Empire, where he adopted Islam, and served as Governor of Aleppo under the name of Murad Paşa/Pasha. His last military victory was defeating Bedouins sieging the city of Aleppo. On 10 December 1850, he died of malaria.

Burial and grave
Bem was buried in a military cemetery in Aleppo. In 1926 a committee was formed to bring his body back to Poland. His mausoleum was designed by Adolf Szyszko-Bohusz and built on an island in a pond, in Strzelecki Park in Tarnów. Since Bem has converted to Islam, as was required for his career in the Ottoman Empire, he couldn't be buried in Catholic ground, but the unique design of this mausoleum – a rectangular sarcophagus standing on six Corinthian columns, above ground – made it possible for him to be buried in his hometown. On the longer side walls of the sarcophagus there are inscriptions: Józef Bem on the front, Bem apó, a magyar szabadságharc legnagyobb hadvezére 1848–1849 ("Grandpa Bem, greatest leader of the Hungarian fight for freedom 1848–1849" in Hungarian) on the back. On the shorter side walls فريق مراد باشا ("Lt. General Murat Pasha") is written on one side and the years 1794, 1850 and 1929 (the years of his birth, death and reburial, respectively) on the other.

The mausoleum has been completed in July 1928. Bem was exhumed on June 20, 1929. Before the coffin reached Tarnów, it was displayed to the public at the National Museum in Budapest, and then in the Wawel Castle in Kraków. The funeral ceremony of General Józef Bem in Tarnów took place on June 30, 1929. The next day, the coffin, after being moved to the building of the Rifle Society, was opened for an anthropological research to be carried out. The skull was too fragile to make a plaster cast. On July 6 in the morning, after the construction of a special scaffolding, the coffin was lifted with cranes to the top of the mausoleum and placed in the sarcophagus, and the side wall was bricked up.

Character and legacy
Bem was a man respected for his courage and heroic temper, both of which were in contrast with his small stature. His influence is said to have been magnetic: although none of his Székely subordinates understood the language he spoke, most revered him. As a soldier Bem was remarkable for his excellent handling of artillery and the rapidity of his marches. In Hungarian, he is often referred to affectionately as "Bem apó", which roughly translates into "Grandpa Bem" or "Old man Bem".

In the 1930s Hungary and Poland each had a regiment of mounted artillery named for him.

A statue to his honour has been erected at Marosvásárhely (now Târgu-Mureş, Romania) but he lives still more enduringly in the verses of the Hungarian national poet Sándor Petőfi, who fell in the fatal action of 31 July 1849 at the Battle of Segesvár.

The Hungarian Revolution of 1956 (which originally started as a sympathy protest, supporting the Polish Poznań protests) began on October 23 with a protest at the foot of the Bem Statue in Budapest.

Works 

Józef Bem published also in French, Polish and German languages books about the history of Poland, technology and military aspects:

Józef Bem – "La Pologne dans ses anciennes limites et l'empire des Russies" 1836
Józef Bem - "Notes sur les fusées incendiaires"
Józef Bem – "Erfahrungen über die Congrevischen Raketen" (Uwagi o rakietach zapalających, Practical Knowledge of Incendiary Rockets) 1820
Józef Bem – "O machinach parowych" (About Steam Engines) 
Józef Bem – "Węgrzy i Polacy w dzisiejszym stanie Europy" (Hungarians and Poles in Contemporary Europe)  
Józef Bem – "O powstaniu narodowym" (About National Uprisng)

Honors
 Three commemorative postage stamps were issued on 10 December 1950 by Hungary on account of his death centenary.
 A souvenir sheet was issued on 10 December 1950 by Hungary on Stamp Day.
 On 15 March 1952 his stamp appears in Heroes of the 1848 Revolution series.
 Poland issued a commemorative postage stamp on 15 July 1948 in Revolution Centenaries series.
 Poland issued postage stamp on 10 December 1950 on his death centenary.

Gallery

In popular culture 
The great Polish poet Cyprian Norwid, a descendant of Jan III Sobieski, dedicated to Józef Bem the poem Bema pamięci żałobny rapsod (Funeral Rhapsody in Memory of Bem), which was subsequently used by other artists including Zbigniew Herbert and Czesław Niemen.

Since 1969 Czesław Niemen's Bema pamięci żałobny rapsod (Mourner's Rhapsody in Memory of Bem) became cult status in Central Europe and also beyond the Iron Curtain.

In 1974 an English version was re-recorded with the help of Michał Urbaniak, John Abercrombie, Jan Hammer, Rick Laird and Don Grolnick, which was published worldwide by CBS Records International.

In 1977 the Bema pamięci żałobny rapsod (Mourner's Rhapsody in Memory of Bem) intro from the 1970 initial issue was bootlegged by the West German rock band Jane as intro and reprise intro for the second side of their elegic Krautrock album Between Heaven and Hell also immediately achieving golden record status.

Józef Bem's descendants are present mainly among artists and in music related business in Poland and in exile and include the jazz singer Ewa Bem and her brothers Aleksander Bem and the jazz guitarist Jarosław Bem.

See also
History of Poland
Poland-Hungary relations

References 

  In turn, it gives the following references:
 Johann Czetz, Memoiren über Bems Feldzug (Hamburg, 1850)
 Kálmán Deresnyi, General Bem's Winter Campaign in Transylvania, 1848–1849 (Hung.), (Budapest, 1896).

External links
 Sydney Morning Herald

1794 births
1850 deaths
People from Tarnów
Hungarian Revolution of 1848
Pashas
Polish Muslims
Military personnel of the Ottoman Empire
People of the Revolutions of 1848
Polish engineers
Polish generals
Polish military writers
19th-century Polish nobility
Recipients of the Gold Cross of the Virtuti Militari
Converts to Islam from Christianity
Generals of the November Uprising
Hungarian people of Polish descent
Chevaliers of the Légion d'honneur
Polish generals in other armies
Polish emigrants to the Ottoman Empire
Polish military personnel of the Napoleonic Wars